Suna Kan (born October 21, 1936 in Adana, Turkey) is a Turkish violinist.

She started playing the violin at the age of five and gave her first public concerts when she was only nine years old, performing Mozart's A major and Viotti's A minor violin concertos with the Presidential Symphony Orchestra. She continued her studies in Ankara under Walter Gerhard, Izzet Albayrak and Lico Amar. In 1949 she was sent to France on scholarship, under a special law passed by the Turkish Grand National Assembly. She studied with Gabriel Bouillon at the Conservatoire de Paris and graduated in 1952, winning the first prize.

Upon returning homeland, starting from the 1960s, she gave concerts in Anatolia first with the Turkish pianist Ferhunde Erkin and then with Gülay Uğurata regularly. Her partnership with Uğurata lasted 29 years. After Uğurata's death, she formed a duo with the pianist Cana Gürmen.

Suna Kan's extensive concert tours have so far covered most parts of the world, including England, France, Germany, Italy, Switzerland, Belgium, the Netherlands, Sweden, Norway, Russia, China, Japan, South American countries, Canada and the United States. She has performed with many international orchestras such as the London Symphony, the Los Angeles Philharmonic, Bamberg Symphony, Residentie Orchestra (the Netherlands), Moscow Symphony, French National Radio Symphony (ORTF) under great conductors like István Kertész, Arthur Fiedler, Walter Susskind, Hans Rosbaud,  Zubin Mehta, Gotthold Lessing, Louis Frémaux and Michel Plasson. She also collaborated with celebrated artists like Yehudi Menuhin, Igor Bezrodny, Pierre Fournier, André Navarra, and Frederick Riddle in performing double concertos.

In the 1970s Suna Kan acted as one of the founders of TRT Ankara Chamber Orchestra together with conductor Gürer Aykal and music critic Faruk Güvenç, also his husband. She played with the orchestra as a solo violinist and a member of the violin group. Since 1986, in addition to her concerts, broadcasts and recording activities, she is  professor of violin at the Music and Performing Arts Department of Bilkent University, in Ankara.

In 1971, she received the title "State Artist" from the Turkish government. She was also awarded "Chevalier dans l'ordre National du Merite" by the Government of France. In 1996 she received the Sevda Cenap And Foundation Golden Medal, a prize offered to the distinctive performers and artists of classical music in Turkey. In 1997, the book "Suna Kan: The Violin Heartfeltly Played" by Müşerref Hekimoğlu was published by the same foundation.

During her career, she played with giants like Yehudi Menuhin, André Navarra and Pierre Fournier and received great acclaim for her interpretations from these masters.

In her interpretations, Suna Kan combines perfection and balance in a lucid manner that remains far from ostentation. A pioneer in interpreting the works of Turkish symphonic composers written for violin, she played Necil Kazim Akses', Ahmed Adnan Saygun's and Ulvi Cemal Erkin's "Violin Concerto"s.

Kan made few recordings. this is partly because during the most brilliant years of her career, recording business in Turkey was quite inactive. Her few recordings, some of them from live concerts, include Ulvi Cemal Erkin's "Violin Concerto"s playings with Presidential Symphony Orchestra and Munich Philharmonic and all the violin concertos of Mozart with TRT Ankara Chamber Orchestra. One of her most popular recordings was with Corrado Galzio on pianoforte and Kan on violino performing Brahms, Grieg, Debussy, Bartok and Dvorak.

Although she has not gained international popularity that matches her artistic stance as a violinist, she remained in the hearts of a small group of connoisseurs in Turkey as a great virtuoso of a distinctive, special and pure tone.

References

Turkish classical violinists
People from Adana
1936 births
Living people
Conservatoire de Paris alumni
Knights of the Ordre national du Mérite
State Artists of Turkey
Women classical violinists
20th-century classical violinists
20th-century women musicians
21st-century classical violinists
21st-century women musicians